Penn Zero: Part-Time Hero is an American animated television series produced by Disney Television Animation for Disney XD. The series debuted on December 5, 2014, as a preview, followed by the official premiere on February 13, 2015. The series was ordered on October 16, 2013, for a scheduled fall 2014 premiere.

On April 22, 2015, it was announced that the series had been renewed for a second season. On July 19, 2016, it was announced that the show would be ending after two seasons. The second season premiered on July 10, 2017. This series was discontinued on July 28, 2017.

Series overview

Episodes

Season 1 (2014–15)
Mercury Filmworks provided the animation for this season.

Season 2 (2017)
Tycoon Animation and Top Draw Animation both provided the animation for this season replacing Mercury Filmworks.

References

Lists of American children's animated television series episodes

de:Penn Zero – Teilzeitheld#Episodenliste
fr:Penn Zero : Héros à mi-temps#Épisodes
it:Penn Zero: Eroe Part-Time#Episodi
he:פן זירו - גיבור במשרה חלקית#פרקים
pl:Penn Zero – bohater na pół etatu#Spis odcinków
pt:Penn Zero: Part-Time Hero#Episódios
ro:Penn Zero: Erou Part-Time#Episoade
vi:Penn Zero: Anh hùng bán thời gian#Các tập phim